"Candidatus Polarisedimenticola svalbardensis" is a candidate species of Acidobacteriota.

References

Bacteria described in 2021
Acidobacteriota
Candidatus taxa